These are the results of 2017 BWF World Senior Championships' 60+ events.

Men's singles

Seeds
 Dan Travers (champion, gold medal)
 Arnold Dendeng (final, silver medal)
 Toshio Kawaguchi (third round)
 Vladimir Koloskov (quarterfinals)
 Chan Wan Seong (semifinals, bronze medal)
 Tariq Farooq (quarterfinals)
 Sergey Bushuev (quarterfinals)
 Ong Then Lin (semifinals, bronze medal)

Finals

Top half

Section 1

Section 2

Bottom half

Section 3

Section 4

Women's singles

Seeds
 Christine M. Crossley (champion, gold medal)
 Christine Black (final, silver medal)
 Sugako Morita (semifinals, bronze medal)
 Sayolo Takebayashi (semifinals, bronze medal)

Finals

Top half

Section 1

Section 2

Bottom half

Section 3

Section 4

Men's doubles

Seeds
 Jiamsak Panitchaikul /  Richard Traviss (quarterfinals)
 Tariq Farooq /  Karsten Meier (final, silver medal)
 Chan Wan Seong / Yap Foo Keong (second round)
 John Kindred / Ian M. Purton (semifinals, bronze medal)

Finals

Top half

Section 1

Section 2

Bottom half

Section 3

Section 4

Women's doubles

Seeds
 Christine Black /  Christine M. Crossley (final, silver medal)
 Sugako Morita / Sayoko Takebayashi (champions, gold medal)

Group A

Group B

Group C

Group D

Finals

Mixed doubles

Seeds
 Dan Travers / Christine Black (final, silver medal)
 Ian M. Purton / Christine M. Crossley (champions, gold medal)
 William Metcalfe / Marcia Jackson (quarterfinals)
 Roger Taylor / Anne C. Bridge (quarterfinals)

Finals

Top half

Section 1

Section 2

Bottom half

Section 3

Section 4

References

Men's singles
Results

Women's singles
Results

Men's doubles
Results

Women's doubles
Group A Results
Group B Results
Group C Results
Group D Results
Finals Results

Mixed doubles
Results

2017 BWF World Senior Championships